Antyradio is a Polish radio network broadcasting all genres of rock music, although mostly broadcasting contemporary rock hits. The current owner of the network is Eurozet.

Antyradio started broadcasting on 1 June 2005.

Managers:

Marcin Bąkiewicz - Editor-in-chief, Programme Director, Music Director 
Cezary Skoczeń - Marketing Manager 

DJs: 

Tomasz Kasprzyk - „Kasprologia”, "Blok z Wielkiej Płyty"
Aleksander Ostrowski - „Ostry Dyżur”
Jerzy Owsiak - „Zaraz Będzie Ciemno”
Bartek Synowiec - „Rockomotywa”
Joanna Zientarska - „Odjechani”
Włodzimierz Zientarski - „Odjechani”
Piotr "Makak" Szarłacki - „MakakArt”, „Makakofonia”
Jarosław "Anzelmo" Giers - "Rzeźnia"
Michał Figurski - „Najgorsze Państwo Świata”
Karolina Korwin-Piotrowska - „Najgorsze Państwo Świata”
Małgorzata Wierzejewska - „Najgorsze Państwo Świata” 
Krzysztof Dowgird - "Wieczorne Rozmowy"
Wiesław Weiss - "Teraz Rock w Antyradiu"
Jarek Szubrycht - "Wszystko w Sam Raz"
Leszek Gnoiński - "Rockolekcje"
Piotr "Frank" Marciniak - "Turbo Top" and sport news
Grzegorz Kornacki, Joanna Obuchowska, Mieszko Dreszer, Magdalena Poddańczyk, Magdalena Mleczko - „Prawda” (news), „Cała Prawda” (reporters' magazine)
Pawel Loroch - "Gastrofaza"
information for drivers - "AntyRadar"
news about cultural events - „Pełna kultura”

Frequencies (FM)

References

External links
Official website
Official fanclub

Radio stations in Poland
Radio stations established in 2005